Turkish Airlines Flight 634 was a scheduled domestic passenger flight from Turkish Airlines' hub at Istanbul Atatürk Airport to Diyarbakır Airport in southeastern Turkey. On 8 January 2003 at 20:19 EET (18:19 UTC), the aircraft operating the flight, a British Aerospace Avro RJ100, struck the ground on final approach approximately  short of the runway threshold during inclement weather conditions. In the following collision with a slope, a post-crash fire broke out, killing 75 of the 80 occupants, including the entire crew.

Background

Aircraft
The aircraft involved in the accident was a 1993-built British Aerospace Avro RJ100 with manufacturer serial number E3241. Owned by Trident Jet (Dublin) Limited, it was equipped with four Lycoming LF507-1F turbofan engines and was delivered to the airline in March 1994. At the time of the accident, it had accumulated a total of 20,000 flight hours in a total of 17,000 flight cycles.

Crew and passengers
The aircrew consisted of two pilots and three flight attendants. Captain Alaaddin Yunak, a former Turkish Air Force pilot aged 34, had joined Turkish Airlines in 1995 and had accumulated 6,309 flight hours in total. First Officer Ismail Altug Ulusu, aged 33, had joined Turkish Airlines in 1998 and had since clocked 2,052 flight hours in total. The flight was carrying 75 passengers. Of the 80 people on board, initially six passengers survived but one passenger later succumbed to his injuries.

Accident
Flight 634 departed Istanbul Atatürk Airport at 18:43 EET (16:43 UTC) for the nearly two-hour flight to Diyarbakır in southeastern Turkey.

The crew acknowledged the call and prepared the aircraft for landing, deploying the landing gear and extending the flaps. Continuing to descend, the aircraft reached its minimum descent altitude (MDA) of  – the lowest altitude to which descent is authorized on final approach or during circle-to-land maneuvering in execution of a standard instrument approach procedure where no electronic glideslope is provided (the airport was not equipped with an instrument landing system) – but both pilots said that they still had no visual reference to the runway or its approach lighting system because of the thick fog. One pilot discerned some lights in the distance but was not sure what exactly they belonged to.

The aircraft slid on the ground for about  while starting to disintegrate. Eventually, it hit a slope, broke up into three major pieces, exploded and caught fire; most of the bodies and parts of the wreckage were burnt.

The impact instantly killed both pilots, the three flight attendants and 69 of the 75 passengers. Six passengers survived, one of whom however later succumbed to his injuries in hospital.

Immediate response
Since the crash site was within the boundaries of the airport, search and rescue teams of the 2nd Tactical Air Force Command stationed at Diyarbakır Air Base, which included two helicopters, were quickly deployed. However, neither helicopter was able to participate in the rescue efforts because of the dense fog, which, according to eyewitness accounts, was below one metre at times. Numerous firetrucks and ambulances were deployed to extinguish the post-crash fire and rescue the victims.

Investigation

The investigation into the accident was carried out by Turkey's Directorate General of Civil Aviation (DGCA). Both flight recorders – the cockpit voice recorder (CVR) and the flight data recorder (FDR) – were found intact and were sent to Turkish Airlines' laboratories for analysis.

According to records, Captain Yunak and First Officer Ulusu were found to have been properly trained, qualified and experienced. They had sufficient rest before reporting for duty on the day of the accident. Drug and alcohol tests returned negative results.

Investigators also turned their attention to the aircraft, but were not able to detect any abnormalities. All maintenance checks were completed properly. Close examination of the engines revealed that they were operating normally at the time of the accident. The aircraft was properly configured for landing – the flaps and the landing gear were extended properly and the altimeter was set correctly – and the ground proximity warning system (GPWS) also produced alarms which could be easily heard on the CVR recordings.

This clearly contradicts the weather report the air traffic controller at Diyarbakır Airport had relayed to the crew minutes before the crash. According to them, the fire could not even be seen until arriving on the scene.

Analysis of the FDR and the CVR revealed that at the moment the aircraft struck the ground it was at a heading of 339° (north-northwest, in line with the runway centerline) and  short of the threshold of runway 34 at a positive pitch angle of five degrees (which corresponds to a slight nose-up position). The autopilot was found to have been activated up until a short time before the accident.

Final report
The investigation was completed around two years later in April 2005 and concluded that:

The Turkish Airline Pilots Association stated that an instrument landing system might have prevented the accident.

See also

 Crossair Flight 3597 – An Avro RJ100 which crashed in similar circumstances.
 2010 Polish Air Force Tu-154 crash – A crash of the Polish presidential airplane while the pilots were trying to establish a visual contact in an unfamiliar airport in thick fog.
Air China Flight 129
American Airlines Flight 965
Trigana Air Flight 267
Santa Barbara Airlines Flight 518
Alitalia Flight 404
PIA Flight 268
Thai Airways International Flight 311

References

2003 disasters in Turkey
Aviation accidents and incidents in 2003
Aviation accidents and incidents in Turkey
2003 in Turkey
634
Airliner accidents and incidents involving controlled flight into terrain
Accidents and incidents involving the British Aerospace 146
Airliner accidents and incidents involving fog
Airliner accidents and incidents caused by pilot error
History of Diyarbakır
January 2003 events in Europe